Chris Clifford (born May 26, 1966) is a Canadian former professional ice hockey goaltender, who played two games in the National Hockey League with the Chicago Black Hawks. He filled in for Murray Bannerman in a 1985 game and for Ed Belfour in a 1989 game. He won the Bobby Smith Trophy in 1985–86. Clifford was drafted in the sixth round of the 1984 NHL Entry Draft. He later became a lawyer.

Playing career
Clifford was born in Kingston, Ontario. He spent his junior career with the Ontario Hockey League's Kingston Canadians and most of his professional career with various teams in the International Hockey League. Clifford became the first goaltender in Ontario Hockey League history to score a goal. In December 2019, Chris Clifford had his jersey number retired by the Kingston Frontenacs joining 4 other players in the franchise's history.

Chris remains an active member of the Ottawa Senators and Chicago Blackhawk Alumni networks.

Post-playing career
After his hockey career, Chris attended law school at Queen's University and is now a partner at Bergeron Clifford LLP in Ontario, Canada. Chris has consistently ranked as one of the top injury lawyers in Canada. He is a recognized Top Lawyer in Canada. Since 2015, Chris has been recognized as a Best Lawyer in Canada for his work in personal injury litigation. Along with his business partner Edward Bergeron, Chris has also received recognition from the Law Society of Ontario as a Certified Specialist in Civil Litigation.

Chris also served as a trustee to the Law Foundation of Ontario until 2016.

Career statistics

Regular season and playoffs

References

External links
 

1966 births
Living people
Canadian ice hockey goaltenders
Chicago Blackhawks draft picks
Chicago Blackhawks players
Fort Wayne Komets players
Ice hockey people from Ontario
Kingston Canadians players
Louisville Icehawks players
Muskegon Fury players
Muskegon Lumberjacks players
Saginaw Hawks players
Sportspeople from Kingston, Ontario
Virginia Lancers players